Heatwave Interactive is an Austin, Texas based video game developer founded in 2007 by M. Tomas, Anthony Castoro, and Donn Clendenon.

Titles
Heatwave has developed games and apps for several platforms:
 iSamJackson, an application featuring voice clips of Samuel L. Jackson for the iPhone, iPod Touch and iPad
 The Platinum Life series of music industry role-playing games for social media sites
 Gods & Heroes: Rome Rising, an MMORPG for Windows PCs
 Eternal Knights, an unreleased horror/suspense property

References

External links
 Heatwave Interactive's website

Video game development companies
Companies based in Austin, Texas
American companies established in 2007
Video game companies based in Texas